The Party of Democratic Reform was a liberal-monarchist political party in the Russian Empire, founded at the beginning of 1906 during the elections to the First Duma, from elements who found the Cadet programme too leftist. The party merged with the Party of Peaceful Renovation in 1907.

References

Political parties established in 1906
Political parties in the Russian Empire
1906 establishments in the Russian Empire
Liberal parties in Russia